The village of Dorfmark is part of the borough of Bad Fallingbostel in Heidekreis district in the German state of Lower Saxony.

The River Böhme flows through Dorfmark and discharges into the Aller between Hodenhagen and Rethem.

History 
Tumuli from the Old Bronze Age are the most visible witnesses of earlier settlement.

The first mention of Dorfmark in the records was around 968 (as Thormarcon). In 1927/28 the village incorporated the farming communities of Westendorf, Fischendorf, Dorfmark and Winkelhausen. Since the regional reorganisation in 1974, Dorfmark has belonged to Bad Fallingbostel. Previously it had been independent.

Economy 
An important economic factor in the village, in addition to handicrafts and agriculture, is tourism. In the industrial estate is one of the largest used car centres in Europe: ALD AutoLeasing D sells there about 10,000 former leased cars per year.

Transport 
Dorfmark lies immediately next to A 7 motorway exit no. 46. The B 440 federal road begins at the exit and runs to Rotenburg (Wümme). The Landesstraße L 163 runs through the village in a north-south direction from Soltau to Bad Fallingbostel and crosses the B 440 within the village. Dorfmark also has a station on the Heath Railway that runs from Hanover to Soltau.

Events 
Wine festival (Weinfest): Organised by the volunteer fire service (Freiwillige Feuerwehr) and takes place every year at Whitsun weekend.
Shooting festival (Schützenfest): The annual Dorfmark shooting festival takes place at the beginning of July and lasts for two days.
Beach festival (Strandfest): Since 1928 the beach festival has been celebrated every second weekend in August. It attracts thousands of spectators every year from a wide radius.
Krämer Market (Krämermarkt): The annual Krämer Market is at the end of September each year. It is a large street flea market with a range of events in the village centre.
Christmas Market (Weihnachtsmarkt): In recent years on the third weekend of Advent a Christmas market has been set up by a group of hired artists from the area and the church parish of Dorfmark.
Various events by the parish of Dorfmark.
Various events by the parish's local heritage group.

Places of interest 
the Evangelical church of St. Martin
Market place
Well
Bommühle mill
Bürgerpark municipal park (which even has plants that are on the IUCN's Red List.)
Fish ponds

People
Friedrich Missler (b 1858 in Dorfmark d 1922 in Bremen) wealthy and benevolent Bremen merchant
Erich von Manstein (b Fritz Erich von Lewinski, m 24 November 1887 in Berlin; d 10 June 1973 in Irschenhausen/Isartal; buried in Dorfmark)
Hans-Joachim Walde (b 1942), track athlete. Bronze medal winner in the decathlon at the 1964 Olympic Games in Tokyo; silver medal winner in the decathlon at the 1968 Olympic Games in Mexico City.
Lilo Wanders (actually Ernie Reinhard; b 1955), actor and drag artist, who spent his childhood in Dorfmark
Frank Ordenewitz (b 1965), former professional footballer

References

External links 
The Heidmark

Villages in Lower Saxony
Heidmark